Tresana is a comune (municipality) in the Province of Massa and Carrara in the Italian region Tuscany, located about  northwest of Florence and about  northwest of Massa.

Tresana borders the following municipalities: Bolano, Calice al Cornoviglio, Licciana Nardi, Mulazzo, Podenzana, and Villafranca in Lunigiana.

Sights include the remains of the Malaspina Castle at Giovagallo.

References

Cities and towns in Tuscany